Bhagabat Behera (1940–2002) was an Indian politician from Odisha. He was a close associate of Biju Patnaik, and was also a former Cabinet Minister and 5-time MLA from Nayagarh in the Odisha Legislative Assembly.

Early life and education
Bhagabat Behera was born to Narayan Behera in a Hindu Gopal (Yadav) family at Biruda Gram Panchayat of Nayagarh, Odisha. He completed his graduation from Ravenshaw University, Cuttack.

References 

State cabinet ministers of Odisha
1940 births
2002 deaths
Biju Janata Dal politicians